The Best Little Secrets Are Kept is the second album by Louis XIV. It was released on March 21, 2005 (see 2005 in music) internationally and a day later in the United States. The album is named after a line from their song "Pledge of Allegiance"

Track listing
 "Louis XIV" (Hill/Karscig) – 3:05
 "Finding Out True Love Is Blind" (Hill/Karscig) – 4:14
 "Paper Doll" (Hill) – 3:25
 "God Killed the Queen" (Hill/Karscig) – 2:48
 "A Letter to Dominique" (Hill/Karscig) – 3:04
 "Illegal Tender" (Hill/Karscig/Maigaard) – 3:13
 "Pledge of Allegiance" (Hill) – 3:37
 "Hey Teacher" (Hill/Karscig) – 3:42
 "All the Little Pieces" (Hill/Karscig) – 4:51
 "Ball of Twine" (Hill) – 5:57
 "Every Which Way That I Can" (Japan only bonus track)
 "Love Stricken Felony" (Japan only bonus track)

Personnel
Louis XIV
 Brian Karscig – vocals, guitar, piano, vocals, string arrangements; bass (tracks 6, 8)
 Jason Hill – lead guitar, vocals, piano, producer, engineer, string arrangements, mixing; bass (tracks 1, 4, 5, 7, 9)
 James Edwards Armbrust – bass (tracks 2, 3, 10)
 Mark Anders Maigaard – drums

Additional Musicians
 Lindsey Troy – vocals
 Frank Palumbo – trumpet
 Robert Arthur Dodds – guitar
 Clayton Bullock – violin
 Louis Caverly – violin
 Michelle Negele – viola
 Andrew Shulman – cello

Technical
 Alex Albrecht – assistant engineer
 Sam Buffa – collage
 Smith Darby – photography
 John Hofstetter – artwork
 Matt Hyde – mixing
 Phil Mucci – photography
 John Rubeli - A&R
 Dave Schultz – mastering

Charts

Album

Singles

Louis XIV (band) albums
2005 debut albums
Atlantic Records albums